WASP-80 is a K-type main-sequence star about 162 light-years away. The star's age is much younger than the Sun's at 1.352 billion years. WASP-80 is similar to the Sun in concentration of heavy elements, although this measurement is highly uncertain.

The star was named Petra in 2019 by Jordanian amateur astronomers as part of the NameExoWorlds contest.

Three multiplicity surveys in 2015-2018 did not detect any stellar companions to WASP-80, but a survey in 2020 did detect a 0.07 companion candidate at an angular separation 2.132 arcseconds, with a false alarm probability of 3%.

Planetary system
In 2013 a transiting hot Jupiter planet b was detected on a tight, circular orbit. The planet was named Wadirum by Jordanian astronomers in December 2019.

Measurement of the Rossiter–McLaughlin effect in 2015 revealed WASP-80b's is orbit is well aligned with the equatorial plane of the star, with orbital obliquity equal to 14°.

Although one transmission spectrum of the planetary atmosphere showed signs of ionised potassium, another measurement in 2017 yielded a gray and featureless spectrum, probably due to a high cloud deck or haze in the atmosphere of WASP-80b.

References

Aquila (constellation)
K-type main-sequence stars
Planetary systems with one confirmed planet
Planetary transit variables
J20124017-0208391
Petra